Clifton Heights is a borough in Delaware County, Pennsylvania, United States, located on Darby Creek  west of downtown Philadelphia. As of the 2010 census the population was 6,652.

History
The population of the borough was 1,820 in 1890, 3,155 in 1910, and reached a maximum of 10,268 in 1960.

Clifton Heights is the birthplace of the glam rock band Cinderella. Clifton Heights is the home of Rosati Water Ice, the first Italian ice company in the US.

Geography
Clifton Heights is located in eastern Delaware County at  (39.929062, -75.295760). It is bordered to the northeast by the borough of Lansdowne, to the southeast by the borough of Aldan, and to the west, north, and southeast by Upper Darby Township.

Clifton Heights is bordered by Darby Creek to the west.

Transportation

No numbered highways serve Clifton Heights directly. The main thoroughfares include Baltimore Avenue, which follows a southwest-to-northeast alignment, and Springfield Road, which follows a northwest-to-southeast alignment. The two roads intersect near the center of the borough. Baltimore Avenue leads northeast into Philadelphia and southwest  to Media.

Demographics

As of a Census 2015 estimate, the racial makeup of the borough was 67.6% non-Hispanic White, 21.4% African American, 6.9% Asian, 2.1% from other races, and 2.5% from two or more races. Hispanic or Latino of any race were 3.4% of the population. 14.5% of the borough's population was foreign-born .

As of the census of 2000, there were 6,779 people, 2,714 households, and 1,696 families residing in the borough. The population density was 10,882.5 people per square mile (4,221.6/km2). There were 2,883 housing units at an average density of 4,628.2 per square mile (1,795.4/km2). The racial makeup of the borough was 94.22% White, 2.92% African American, 0.06% Native American, 1.50% Asian, 0.38% from other races, and 0.91% from two or more races. Hispanic or Latino of any race were 0.99% of the population.

There were 2,714 households, out of which 31.1% had children under the age of 18 living with them, 42.9% were married couples living together, 14.3% had a female householder with no husband present, and 37.5% were non-families. 31.9% of all households were made up of individuals, and 12.8% had someone living alone who was 65 years of age or older. The average household size was 2.49 and the average family size was 3.20.

In the borough the population was spread out, with 25.8% under the age of 18, 7.9% from 18 to 24, 32.9% from 25 to 44, 18.6% from 45 to 64, and 14.9% who were 65 years of age or older. The median age was 36 years. For every 100 females there were 95.3 males. For every 100 females age 18 and over, there were 90.8 males.

The median income for a household in the borough was $39,291, and the median income for a family was $48,919. Males had a median income of $36,534 versus $32,210 for females. The per capita income for the borough was $20,534. About 11.2% of families and 11.1% of the population were below the poverty line, including 18.1% of those under age 18 and 6.4% of those age 65 or over.

Education
Clifton Heights borough is served by the Upper Darby School District.

Notable people
 Vinnie Paz, American rapper and record label owner. 
Lena Blackburne, baseball player, manager, inventor
Eric Brittingham, bassist of the glam rock band Cinderella
Jim Goad, author
Tom Keifer, singer-songwriter of the glam rock band Cinderella
Dan Morgan, professional football player
Tom Savage, professional football player

References

External links

Borough of Clifton Heights official website

Populated places established in 1885
Boroughs in Delaware County, Pennsylvania